Old Redcliffians Rugby Football Club is an English rugby union team based in Brislington, a suburb of Bristol. The club runs four senior sides and a sevens team as well as a ladies side and the full range of junior teams. The first XV currently plays in National League 2 West, a level four league in the English rugby union system, following promotion from National League 3 South West in 2016–17. The 2011–12 season was successful for the other senior teams as they all achieved promotion; the second XV now play in the Tribute Somerset Premier, the third XV play in Tribute Somerset 1 and the fourth XV play in Tribute Somerset 2 North.

The rugby club was formed in 1918 by former pupils of Redcliffe Boys School.

Current standings

Honours
1st team:
 Combination Merit Table champions (3): 1977–78, 1981–82, 1983–84
 Bristol Combination Cup winners (4): 1979–80, 1982–83, 1984–85, 2012–13
 Somerset Senior Cup winners (4): 1983–84, 1984–85, 1999–00, 2013–14
 Bristol Combination Plate winners: 1989–90
 Somerset Premier champions (2): 2004–05, 2006–07
 Western Counties North champions: 2009–0
 RFU Intermediate Cup winners: 2009–10
 South West 1 (east v west) promotion play-off winner: 2010–11
 South West 1 West champions: 2012–13
 National League 3 South West champions: 2016–17

2nd team:
Somerset 2 North champions: 2007–08
Somerset 1 champions: 2011–12

3rd team:
Somerset 3 North champions: 2008–09
Somerset 2 North champions (2): 2011–12, 2015–16

4th team:
Somerset 3 North champions: 2011–12

Former players
Darren Barry
Graeme Beveridge
Ellis Genge

References

External links
 Official club website

English rugby union teams
Rugby clubs established in 1918
1918 establishments in England
Rugby union in Bristol